Karamites is an extinct cephalopoda genus belonging to the  Ammonoidea and included in the hoplitacean family Placenticeratidae.

Karamites lived during the latest Albian (late early Cretaceous), derived from Semenoviceras. It is the typical form for Central Asia where it occurs with members of the Hoplitidae, e.g. Anahoplites. It is also the direct ancestor of Late Cretaceous placenticeratids such as Placenticeras and Hypengonoceras.

References

Marcinowski, Ryszard.  Change within ammonite assemblages from Mangyshlak mountains (western Kazakhstan) during the mid-Cretaceous transgression. Institute of Geology of the University of Warsaw.  
Cooper, Michael R.; Owen, Hugh G. 2011. The phylogeny and classification of primitive Placenticeratidae (Cretaceous Hoplitina, Hoplitoidea). 

Cretaceous ammonites
Albian genus first appearances
Cenomanian genus extinctions
Placenticeratidae
Ammonitida genera